The 2011 All-Big Ten Conference football team consists of American football players chosen as All-Big Ten Conference players for the 2011 Big Ten Conference football season.  The conference recognizes two official All-Big Ten selectors: (1) the Big Ten conference coaches selected separate offensive and defensive units and named first- and second-team players (the "Coaches" team); and (2) a panel of sports writers and broadcasters covering the Big Ten also selected offensive and defensive units and named first- and second-team players (the "Media" team).

Offensive selections

Quarterbacks
 Russell Wilson, Wisconsin (Coaches-1; Media-1)
 Kirk Cousins, Michigan State (Coaches-2)
 Denard Robinson, Michigan (Media-2)

Running backs
 Montee Ball, Wisconsin (Coaches-1; Media-1)
 Rex Burkhead, Nebraska (Coaches-1; Media-1)
 Marcus Coker, Iowa (Coaches-2; Media-2)
 Silas Redd, Penn State (Coaches-2; Media-2)

Receivers
 A.J. Jenkins, Illinois (Coaches-1; Media-1)
 Marvin McNutt, Iowa (Coaches-1; Media-1)
 B. J. Cunningham, Michigan State (Coaches-2; Media-2)
 Nick Toon, Wisconsin (Coaches-2)
 Jeremy Ebert, Northwestern (Media-2)

Centers
 David Molk, Michigan (Coaches-1; Media-2)
 Peter Konz, Wisconsin (Media-1)
 Mike Caputo, Nebraska (Coaches-2 [tie])
 Mike Brewster, Ohio State (Coaches-2 [tie])

Guards
 Joel Foreman, Michigan State (Coaches-1; Media-1)
 Kevin Zeitler, Wisconsin (Coaches-1; Media-1)
 Travis Frederick, Wisconsin (Coaches-2; Media-2)
 Adam Gettis, Iowa (Coaches-2)
 Spencer Long, Nebraska (Media-2)

Tackles
 Riley Reiff, Iowa (Coaches-1; Media-1)
 Josh Oglesby, Wisconsin (Coaches-1; Media-1)
 Mike Adams, Ohio State (Coaches-2; Media-2)
 Taylor Lewan, Michigan (Coaches-2)
 Jeff Allen, Illinois (Media-2)

Tight ends
 Drake Dunsmore, Northwestern (Coaches-1; Media-1)
 Brian Linthicum, Michigan State (Coaches-2)
 Jacob Pedersen, Wisconsin (Media-2)

Defensive selections

Defensive linemen
 Whitney Mercilus, Illinois (Coaches-1; Media-1)
 Jerel Worthy, Michigan State (Coaches-1; Media-1)
 Devon Still, Penn State (Coaches-1; Media-1)
 John Simon, Ohio State (Coaches-1; Media-2)
 Kawann Short, Purdue (Coaches-2; Media-1)
 Michael Buchanan, Illinois (Coaches-2; Media-2)
 Mike Martin, Michigan (Coaches-2; Media-2)
 William Gholston, Michigan State (Coaches-2; Media-2)
 Mike Daniels, Iowa (Coaches-2)
 Jack Crawford, Penn State (Coaches-2)
 Broderick Binns, Iowa (Media-2)

Linebackers
 Lavonte David, Nebraska (Coaches-1; Media-1)
 Chris Borland, Wisconsin (Coaches-1; Media-1)
 Gerald Hodges, Penn State (Coaches-1; Media-2)
 Mike Taylor, Wisconsin (Coaches-2; Media-2)
 Max Bullough, Michigan State (Coaches-2)
 Andrew Sweat, Ohio State (Coaches-2)
 Denicos Allen, Michigan State (Media-2)
 Jonathan Brown, Illinois (Media-2)
 Gerald Hodges, Penn State (Media-2)

Defensive backs
 Alfonzo Dennard, Nebraska (Coaches-1; Media-1)
 Johnny Adams, Michigan State (Coaches-1; Media-2)
 Shaun Prater, Iowa (Coaches-1)
 Aaron Henry, Wisconsin (Coaches-1)
 Trenton Robinson, Michigan State (Media-1)
 Brian Peters, Northwestern (Media-1)
 Antonio Fenelus, Wisconsin (Media-1)
 Isaiah Lewis, Michigan State (Coaches-2; Media-2)
 Nick Sukay, Penn State (Coaches-2; Media-2)
 C. J. Barnett, Ohio State (Coaches-2)
 Ricardo Allen, Purdue (Coaches-2)
 Micah Hyde, Iowa (Media-2)

Special teams

Kickers
 Brett Maher, Nebraska (Coaches-1; Media-1)
 Carson Wiggs, Purdue (Coaches-2)
 Anthony Fera, Penn State (Media-2)

Punter
 Brett Maher, Nebraska (Coaches-1; Media-1)
 Cody Webster, Purdue (Coaches-2; Media-2)

Key
Bold = Consensus first-team selection by both the coaches and media

Coaches = Selected by the Big Ten Conference coaches

Media = Selected by the conference media

See also
 2011 College Football All-America Team

References

All-Big Ten Conference
All-Big Ten Conference football teams